The 1946 United States Senate election in Vermont took place on November 5, 1946. Incumbent Republican Ralph Flanders successfully ran for re-election to a full term in the United States Senate, defeating Democratic candidate Charles P. McDevitt.

Republican primary

Results

Democratic primary

Results

General election

Candidates
Ralph Flanders (Republican), incumbent U.S. Senator
Charles P. McDevitt, former chair of the Democratic Party of Vermont and former State Senator

Results

References

Vermont
1946
1946 Vermont elections